Nicholas Garnham (born 1937) is Emeritus Professor at the University of Westminster in the academic field of Media Studies.

Education and naval service
Garnham attended Winchester College from 1950 to 1955 where the major influence on his thinking was British socialist historian R. H. Tawney. His main interests were British history, architecture and cinema, the last of which has remained a lifelong passion and research focus. Garnham served in the Royal Navy from 1956 to 1958. He was in one of the last drafts to the service under compulsory conscription. He studied briefly at the Sorbonne in Paris in 1958, before moving to study English literature at Trinity College, Cambridge that same year.

Career
From 1962 until 1970 he was a director and film editor at the BBC. He left to enter academia at the Polytechnic of Central London to teach film making and film theory.  Garnham was central in establishing first Media Studies degree at the University, a Bachelor of Arts course in 1975. He also became part of the university's newly established Communication Studies Department. He was Governor of the British Film Institute (BFI) from 1973 to 1977. He was founding editor of, and has remained a senior editor of, the journal Media, Culture and Society since it was first published in 1979.

Works
The New Priesthood: British Television Today (1970) with Joan Bakewell
Samuel Fuller (1971)
Structures of Television (1972)
The Economics of Television (1988) with Richard Collins and Gareth Locksley
Capitalism and Communication: Global Culture and the Economics of Information (1990) editor Fred Inglis
Emancipation, The Media, And Modernity: Arguments about the Media and Social Theory (2000)
The Information Society is also a Class Society – The Impact of the New Information Technologies on  Cultural Production and Consumption, Information Technology: Impact on the Way of Life (L. Bannion et al., eds). Dublin: Tycooly International (1981)
The Economics of Television, (1987) with R. Collins and G. Locksley
The Media and the Public Sphere (Ed. Calhoun) (1992)
The Role of the Public Sphere in the Information Society, in Regulating the Global Information Society (C.T. Marsden, ed.), London: Routledge. (2000)
Information Society as Theory or Ideology: A Critical Perspective on Technology, Education and Employment in the Information Age  Digital Academe (W. Dutton and B. Loader, eds), pp. 253–67. London: Routledge. (2002)

References

 Ellis Cashmore and Chris Rojek (1999), Dictionary of Cultural Theorists, pp. 179–181
 Cook, D. (1996). The culture industry revisited. Lanham, Maryland: Rowman & Littlefield.
 Gandy, O. H. (1999). Community pluralism and the 'tipping point': Editorial responses to race and related structural change. In D. Demers & K. Viswanath (Eds.), Mass Media, Social Control and Social Change (pp. 159–181). Ames, Iowa.: Iowa State University Press.
 Garnham, N. (2005). A personal intellectual memoir. Media, Culture & Society, 27(4), 469–493.
 Durham, M. G., & Kellner, D. M. (eds) (2001). Media and cultural studies (pp 197–229). Malden, Mass.: Blackwell.

External links
 Biographical page
 Paper
 Paper, The Information Society, Myth or Reality? (PDF)
 Garnham and Habermas, reagle.org
 Paper by Brian Winston (PDF)

1937 births
Living people
College of Sorbonne alumni
British mass media scholars
British Marxists
Marxist theorists
Royal Navy sailors
Alumni of Trinity College, Cambridge
People educated at Winchester College
Academics of the University of Westminster